Pieces of a Real Heart is the fifth studio album from Christian rock band Sanctus Real. It was released on March 9, 2010 via Sparrow Records. The first single released was the song "Forgiven", which reached No. 6 on Billboard's Christian Songs chart. The second single "Lead Me" reached No. 1 on Billboard's Christian Music chart and was nominated for a GMA Dove Award.

According to lead vocalist and songwriter Matt Hammitt, the album title reflects the band's goal of striving to write honest songs. Hammitt once said in an interview, "These songs are pieces of the deepest part of who we are. Since we wrote 'I'm Not Alright' for our album The Face of Love, we have always strived to be really honest with what we are thinking and how it pertains to our faith and draws us closer to the Lord. I think now more than ever these songs are a great picture of what is going on underneath the surface with us."

Track listing

Personnel 
Adapted from the liner notes.

Sanctus Real
 Matt Hammitt – vocals, guitars
 Pete Provost – guitars, banjo
 Chris Rohman – guitars, mandolin
 Dan Gartley – bass
 Mark Graalman – drums

Additional musicians
 Christopher Stevens – keyboards (1, 2, 3, 5-8, 11), programming (1, 2, 3, 5-8, 11)
 Darren King – keyboards (9), programming (9)
 Zach Casebolt – strings (1, 5, 11)
 Claire Indie – strings (1, 5, 11)

Kids Choir on "The Way the World Turns"
 Kelli Harrah, Krista Harris, McKenzie Henderson, Tim Henderson, Memorie Johnston, Cheyanne Jones, Sierra Kelly, Melanie Kronick, Makenzee Lady, Caleb Losh, Al Lowe, Micah Lucas, Jess Manchester, Brittany Mann, Linda May, Grace Mercer, Jessica Moe, Sierra Mottola, Katie Parson, Sunshine Pearson, Wesley Phillips and Kyle Scott

Production 
 Christopher Stevens – producer (1, 2, 3, 5-9, 11), engineer (1, 2, 3, 5-9, 11), mixing (1, 2, 3, 5-9, 11)
 Jason Ingram – producer (4, 10)
 Rusty Varenkamp – producer (4, 10), recording (4, 10)
 Paul Moak – engineer (1, 2, 3, 5-9, 11)
 Taylor Stevens – assistant engineer
 Josh Silverberg – assistant engineer
 Thomas Toner – assistant engineer 
 Bob Boyd – mastering at Ambient Digital (Houston, Texas)
 Christopher York – A&R
Jess Chambers – A&R administration
 Crystal Varenkamp – production assistant (4, 10)
 Jan Cook – creative direction
 Lee Floyd – cover artwork 
 Tec Petaja – photography
 Katie Moore – art direction, layout
 Jesse Hall – hair stylist, make-up
 Talitha Moak – wardrobe styling
 Matt Balm – management

Charts

Accolades

The album was nominated for a Dove Award for Rock/Contemporary Album of the Year at the 42nd GMA Dove Awards, while the song "Lead Me" was nominated for Song of the Year and Pop/Contemporary Recorded Song of the Year.

References

2010 albums
Sanctus Real albums
Sparrow Records albums
Contemporary Christian music albums by American artists